The Sheikh–Wazed family is a prominent Bangladeshi political dynasty, which primarily consists of Sheikh Mujibur Rahman, Sheikh Hasina and their relatives.

The Sheikh–Wazed family is one of the most powerful families in Bangladesh.  Their political involvement has traditionally revolved around the Bangladesh Awami League.

Family origin 

The first member of the Tungipara Sheikh family to come to Bengal was Sheikh Awwal. He was originally from Baghdad but settled in Chittagong in the 15th century, after he visited the region to preach Islam. He was married to a Bengali woman from Sonargaon and settled over there with his wife. His son, Sheikh Zahiruddin, married a girl from the Khandakar family of Kandirpar and settled there with his family. Many years later, he moved to Kolkata with his son Sheikh Jan Mahmud, since their wholesale business was based there. Sheikh Jan Mahmud's son, Sheikh Borhanuddin, continued to run that wholesale business and eventually shifted back to East Bengal. He married a girl from the Kazi family of Tungipara and permanently settled there. His son was Sheikh Qudratullah, who in turn had three sons: Sheikh Abdul Majid, Sheikh Abdul Hamid, and Sheikh Abdul Rashid. Sheikh Abdul Hamid was the father of Sheikh Lutfar Rahman and the paternal grandfather of both Sheikh Mujibur Rahman and his wife Sheikh Fazilatunnesa Mujib, while Sheikh Abdul Majid was the father of Sheikh Sayera Khatun and the maternal grandfather of Sheikh Mujibur Rahman. Sheikh Mujib and Begum Mujib's daughter, Sheikh Hasina, married M. A. Wazed in 1968 and adopted his surname, thus introducing the Wazed surname to the Sheikh family.

Family tree

Early ancestors

Family of Sheikh Lutfar Rahman and Sheikh Sayera Khatun

Family of Sheikh Mujibur Rahman and Sheikh Fazilatunnesa

Family of Sheikh Fatema Begum

Family of Sheikh Asia Begum

Family of Sheikh Amena Begum and Abdur Rab Serniabat

Family of Sheikh Abu Naser and Begum Razia Naser Dolly

Family of Khadijah Hossain Lily and ATM Syed Hossain

Other relatives
Sheikh Abdul Rashid: He was the son of Sheikh Qudratullah, brother of both Sheikh Abdul Majid and Sheikh Abdul Hamid, paternal uncle of both Sheikh Lutfar Rahman and Sheikh Sayera Khatun, and paternal granduncle of both Sheikh Mujib and Begum Mujib. He was given the title of "Khan Saheb" by the erstwhile ruling British.
Sheikh Mosharraf Hossain: He was a paternal uncle of Sheikh Mujibur Rahman. He was a member of the legislative assembly of Pakistan. He was given the title of “Khan Saheb” by the erstwhile ruling [ British Raj]. After independence he became a member of parliament from Gopalganj.
Sheikh Kabir Hossain: Son of Sheikh Mosharraf Hossain and founder of the Fareast International University in Dhaka.
 Sheikh Nadir Hossain: Son of Sheikh Mosharraf Hossain Chairman of Milkvita Bangladesh.
Sheikh Shahidul Islam: Nephew of Sheikh Fazilatunnesa and cousin of Prime Minister Sheikh Hasina.
Shahid Serniabat: He was the nephew of Abdur Rab Serniabat and Sheikh Fazilatunnesa. He was Sheikh Hasina's first-cousin (through her mother) and also her second-cousin (since her parents were first-cousins, Shahid's father and her father were therefore first-cousins). He was killed along with his uncle and cousins in 1975.
General Mustafizur Rahman: He was married to a cousin of Sheikh Mujibur Rahman. He served as the Chief of Army Staff from December 1997 to December 2000. General Rahman was one of the people (including his niece Sheikh Hasina) involved in the Mig-29 corruption scandal.
Mominul Haque Khoka: He was a first-cousin of Sheikh Mujibur Rahman (his mother was the sister of Sheikh Lutfar Rahman, Mujib's father) and a freedom fighter. Khoka died in 2014 at the age of 81 in Singapore, leaving behind a son and a daughter. His daughter, Farhana Haque, is married to Romo Rouf Chowdhury (son of A. Rouf Chowdhury, the founder of Rangs Group) a Bangladeshi businessman.
 Sheikh Akram Hossain (Freedom Fighter and Politician) brother of Begum Fazilatunnesa and cousin of (Bangabandhu Sheikh Mujib) & Uncle of Sheikh Hasina. Akram died in 2009. Leaving behind his children- Sheikh Milly, Sheikh Molly, Sheikh Hera & Sheikh Shafin they are first-cousins of Sheikh Hasina through Begum Fazilatunnesa Mujib. Washif Hossain & Sheikh Tanzid Islam (Grandsons of Sheikh Akram Hossain & Nephews of Sheikh Hasina)

Photos

See also
 Political families of the world

References

 
Bengali families
Bengali politicians
Muslim families
Bangladeshi families
Bangladeshi people of Arab descent